Dos Cabezas, Spanish for Two Heads, is an unincorporated community in Cochise County, located in the U.S. state of Arizona. It is now a ghost town.

References

External links
 Dos Cabezas – Ghost Town of the Month at azghosttowns.com
 

Unincorporated communities in Cochise County, Arizona
Unincorporated communities in Arizona
Ghost towns in Arizona
Cemeteries in Arizona